The Triabunna Football Club, nicknamed The Roos, is an Australian rules football club playing in the Oatlands District Football Association (ODFA) in Tasmania, Australia. Their home ground, the Triabunna Recreation Ground, has an attendance capacity of 3,000.

After the East Coast Bombers folded at the end of the 2015 season in the Southern Football League, The Triabunna Football Club decided to go back to the original Maroon and White colours they had worn for many years beforehand. The Roos joined back into the ODFA, where they are now rebuilding with one of the youngest sides to take the field in ODFA history, The Roos are showing great potential and are looking to be a power house in the next few years.

Origins

Entry to Southern Football League

SFL premiers

SFL Runner Up

State premierships

Club record attendance

Club record score

References

External links
 Southern Football League official website

Australian rules football clubs in Tasmania
1900 establishments in Australia
Australian rules football clubs established in 1900